Hallonquist is a hamlet in Coulee Rural Municipality No. 136, Saskatchewan, Canada. The hamlet is located on Highway 363 about 21 km (13 mi) west of Hodgeville.

Demographics

In 2006, Hallonquist had a population of 15 living in 11 dwellings, a -21.1% decrease from 1996.

History

In 1923 the hamlet of Hallonquist was developed on a branch line of the Canadian Pacific Railway. It was named in honour of Joseph E. Hallonquist, a C.P.R. clerk from Moose Jaw who had been decorated for bravery in World War I.  He enlisted with the RAF and was credited with five aerial victories earning him the title of "Ace" and a Distinguished Flying Cross (RAF).  Shot down over Germany he recuperated in a German hospital before being repatriated.  In its heyday Hallonquist had two general stores, two restaurants, a blacksmith shop, a shoe repair shop, a lumber yard, two livery barns, a butcher shop, a pool hall, a barber shop, three oil agencies, three machine agencies and three elevators. Today, all that remains of the community is the Evangelical Lutheran Church. Also, every year Hallonquist has their amateur rodeo, a get-together for most of that area, including Swift Current.

See also
 List of communities in Saskatchewan
 Hamlets of Saskatchewan

References 

Hallonquist - A Light in the Window. Hallonquist Historical Society, 1983.

Coulee No. 136, Saskatchewan
Unincorporated communities in Saskatchewan
Ghost towns in Saskatchewan